Sadeqiyeh (also Romanized as Şādeqīyeh) is a village in Barf Anbar Rural District, in the Central District of Fereydunshahr County, Isfahan Province, Iran. At the 2006 census, its population was 279, in 63 families.

References 

Populated places in Fereydunshahr County